The 1978 Seattle Seahawks season was the team's third season in the National Football League (NFL). The Seahawks won nine games, giving the franchise its first winning season. Coach Jack Patera won the National Football League Coach of the Year Award at seasons end.

Led by the third ranked offense, the team had some achievements. David Sims led the AFC in total touchdowns – 15, including 14 rushing – and the team had 28 rushing touchdowns, number two in the league. Steve Largent made his first Pro Bowl with 71 receptions and 8 touchdowns.  Quarterback Jim Zorn earned his sole All-Pro honor of his career by making the second team.  This would be the only All-Pro by a Seahawks quarterback until Russell Wilson was selected in 2019. The defense, however, lagged far behind ranking 26th.

Season highlights included defeating the Oakland Raiders twice and a last-second win over the Minnesota Vikings. Also a memorable game was a 20–17 loss in overtime to the Denver Broncos. Following an interception of a Jim Zorn pass off of a deflection, in overtime, the Broncos drove to the 1 yard line, but could not punch it in for a touchdown. Jim Turner missed an 18-yard field goal attempt, but the Seahawks were penalized for having 12 men on the field and the Broncos made the second kick. A 37–10 defeat in San Diego in week 15 eliminated the Seahawks from playoff contention, but a 23–19 win at home against Kansas City gave the team their first winning season.

1978 NFL draft

Personnel

Staff

Final roster

     Starters in bold.
 (*) Denotes players that were selected for the 1979 Pro Bowl.

Schedule

Preseason

Source: Seahawks Media Guides

Regular season
With the start of a 16-game season, inter-conference play began a rotating schedule. Divisional matchups had the AFC West playing the NFC Central.

Bold indicates division opponents.
Source: 1978 NFL season results

Standings

Game summaries

Preseason

Week P1: vs. San Diego Chargers

Week P2: at San Francisco 49ers

Week P3: vs. Los Angeles Rams

Week P4: vs. Chicago Bears

Regular season

Week 1: vs. San Diego Chargers

Week 2: at Pittsburgh Steelers

Week 3: at New York Jets

Week 4: vs. Detroit Lions

Week 5: at Denver Broncos

Week 6: vs. Minnesota Vikings

Week 7: at Green Bay Packers

Week 8: vs. Oakland Raiders

Week 9: vs. Denver Broncos

Week 10: at Chicago Bears

Week 11: vs. Baltimore Colts

Week 12: at Kansas City Chiefs

Week 13: at Oakland Raiders

Week 14: vs. Cleveland Browns

Week 15: at San Diego Chargers

Week 16: vs. Kansas City Chiefs

References

External links
 Seahawks draft history at NFL.com
 1978 NFL season results at NFL.com

Seattle
Seattle Seahawks seasons